Eddy Bartolozzi (born 9 July 1977) is a Venezuelan wrestler. He competed in the men's Greco-Roman 85 kg at the 2000 Summer Olympics.

References

External links
 

1977 births
Living people
Venezuelan male sport wrestlers
Olympic wrestlers of Venezuela
Wrestlers at the 2000 Summer Olympics
People from Ciudad Bolívar
Pan American Games medalists in wrestling
Pan American Games silver medalists for Venezuela
Pan American Games bronze medalists for Venezuela
Wrestlers at the 1999 Pan American Games
Wrestlers at the 2003 Pan American Games
Wrestlers at the 2007 Pan American Games
Medalists at the 2003 Pan American Games
Medalists at the 2007 Pan American Games
20th-century Venezuelan people
21st-century Venezuelan people